Richard Ferrand (born 1 July 1962) is a French politician of La République En Marche! (LREM) who served as President of the National Assembly from 2018 to 2022. He had served as a member of the National Assembly for Finistère's 6th constituency from 2012 to 2022. A longtime member of the Socialist Party, he was the General Secretary LREM from October 2016 and became the leader of the party's group of the National Assembly in June 2017.

Early life 
Ferrand was born on 1 July 1962 in Rodez, France. Ferrand graduated high school in Bünde, Germany and studied German and Law at Toulouse 1 University Capitole and then Université Paris-Descartes where he became a PS member at the age of 18.

After leaving university, Ferrand worked as a journalist for multiple publications including Center Presse, Auto Moto, Circuler, Vie publique, La Dépêche du Midi and Le Monde. In 1991, Ferrand became the communications advisor for Kofi Yamgnane, the then- secretary of state to the Minister of Social Affairs and Integration.

Political career

Early beginnings
Ferrand joined the Socialist Party (PS) in 1980 and was elected as the councillor in the township of Carhaix-Plouguer in 1998 as his first elected office. In the municipal elections in 2001 and 2008, Ferrand lost in both times, obtaining 31% of the vote in 2008.

In the 2010 regional elections, Ferrard was one of the PS nominees for the Finistère department. He became councillor for the region on 21 March 2010 and has since chaired the socialist and related group.

In 2007, Ferrand ran for Finistère's 6th constituency under the PS banner. He lost to Christian Ménard who achieved 50.19% of the vote. In 2012, Ferrand ran in the same constituency for PS where he got 32.2% of the vote in the first round and then 58.3% of the vote in the second round.

Member of the National Assembly
In the National Assembly, Ferrand was a member of the SER (Socialist, Ecologist and Republican) group and sits on the Social Affairs Committee. He has never worked in the agricultural or agri-food sector, but is co-chairman of the agricultural and agro-food industries group. He particularly involves himself in social issues and the use of cheaper labour than currently available.

While on the Social Affairs Committee, Ferrand was an EU-appointed rapporteur on resolutions around workers and the use of cheaper European labor. In his report, he stated that European workers feel detached due to the lack of social cohesion and the use of cheaper labour to replace them. He advocates measures to limit the replacement of workers.

Despite Ferrand's opposition to the Bonnets Rouges movement against the eco-tax, which was started by the Fillon government and further expanded upon by the Ayrault Government, he took a stand against the expansions, saying they underline the complexity of the tax system. He supports amendments to the eco-tax. After there was a postponement of the eco-tax, Ferrand and other Breton politicians asked Minister of Energy, Ségolène Royal to rethink the tax plan.

On 3 October 2014, the Prime Minister Manuel Valls appointed Ferrard along with the minister of economy, Emmanuel Macron to work on a plan to reform regulations based around labour. He was tasked with looking at the "legal framework that restricts labour from developing" while paying attention to the different situations from many different regions. After consulting many trade unions, experts and other associations, he submitted the report that stresses that reforming the regulated labor market is needed but "reform, don't break, this includes twenty-eight proposals that are aimed particularly at promoting young people's access to the job market."

Ferrand was then appointed as the general rapporteur, one of the biggest reforms within the first five years of President Hollande's term with over 300 articles and sectors such as: transport, savings, labor courts, housings and qualified professions being reformed. More than one hundred and eleven hours went into debate in the National Assembly over the reform. The text was eventually adopted including measures that were originally not there but added during parliamentary debate such as: Letting commercial stores open on Sundays, liberalization of transport services and encouraging qualified professions to allow young people into the profession.

General Secretary of En Marche!
On 16 October 2016, Ferrand was appointed General Secretary of En Marche! by Emmanuel Macron, someone he worked with closely when he was the minister for Economy. The following month, he resigned from leading the PS group in the regional council for Finistère, and confirmed that he quit the PS on 9 May 2017.

Leader of the REM group in the National Assembly
On 24 June 2017, it was announced that Ferrand was officially elected leader of La République En Marche! group in the National Assembly with 306 votes and 2 abstentions.

Ahead of the 2022 legislative elections, he helped formed a coalition of LREM with two other centrist parties – Democratic Movement (MoDem) and Horizons –  to coordinate which candidates it presents.

In the 2022 French legislative election, Ferrand would be ousted from the French National Assembly after losing his seat to Socialist rival Mélanie Thomin.

References

External links

|-

1962 births
Living people
People from Rodez
Politicians from Occitania (administrative region)
Toulouse 1 University Capitole alumni
Paris Descartes University alumni
Socialist Party (France) politicians
La République En Marche! politicians
Presidents of the National Assembly (France)
Deputies of the 14th National Assembly of the French Fifth Republic
Deputies of the 15th National Assembly of the French Fifth Republic